Katariina Kaitue (born 21 January 1967 in Helsinki) is a Finnish actress. She has been a regular actress since 1991 at the Finnish National Theatre, where she has performed dozens of roles.

Kaitue studied at the Helsinki Theatre Academy from 1987 to 1991. Along with her theatre career, she has appeared in films and performed voice acting, among other things in Disney's cartoons.

Kaitue is the daughter of actress Liisamaija Laaksonen and sister of business manager Karri Kaitue. In 2007, Kaitue became engaged to Matti Vänskä. She has two children from her previous marriage with Sakari Harima.

Filmography 
 Kirkkaalta taivaalta
 Ihmiselon ihanuus ja kurjuus (1988)
 Vääpeli Körmy ja marsalkan sauva (1990)
 Siivotaan, siivotaan (1991–1992) viihdesarja
 Kaivo (1992)
 Romanovin kivet (1993)
 Onnen maa (1993)
 Isältä pojalle (1996)
 Viisi tytärtäni (1997) television series
 Rakkauden tanssi osa 1 (1998)
 Poika ja ilves (1998)
 Johtaja Uuno Turhapuro – pisnismies (1998)
 Häjyt (1999)
 Tunteen palo (1999)
 Mennyt heinäkuu (1999)
 Presidentti (2000)
 Parhaat vuodet (2000-2002)
 Kaverille ei jätetä (2001)
 Emmauksen tiellä (2001)
 Duetto Amoroso (2002)
 Juoksuhaudantie (2004)
 Game Over (2005)
 Suden vuosi (2007)
 Lacrimosa (2008) television series
 Helppo elämä (2009)
 Kotirauha (2011)
 Roskisprinssi (2011)

References

External links
 

1967 births
Living people
Actresses from Helsinki
Finnish film actresses
Finnish stage actresses
Finnish television actresses
20th-century Finnish actresses
21st-century Finnish actresses